Poekilocerus is a genus of grasshoppers (Caelifera) in the family Pyrgomorphidae and the tribe Poekilocerini. Species are found in Africa, India, Indo-China, Malesia through to New Guinea.

Species
The Orthoptera Species File lists the following:
Poekilocerus arabicus Uvarov, 1922
Poekilocerus bufonius Klug, 1832
Poekilocerus calotropidis Karsch, 1888
Poekilocerus geniplanus Gupta & Chandra, 2016
Poekilocerus pictus (Fabricius, 1775) - type species (as Gryllus pictus Fabricius)

Gallery

References

External links

Caelifera genera
Pyrgomorphidae